William Holms (5 February 1827 – 8 October 1903) was a Scottish businessman and Liberal politician who sat in the House of Commons from 1874 to 1884.

Holms was the son of James Holms of Sancel Bank, Paisley and his wife Janet Love, daughter of James Love of Paisley. He was educated at Paisley Grammar School and Glasgow University and was partner in a textile company with factories in Glasgow and London. He was a J.P. for Lanarkshire and Lieutenant Colonel of the 1st Lanarkshire Artillery.

At the 1874 general election Holms was elected Member of Parliament for Paisley. He held the seat until 1884 when he resigned.

Holms married Mary Lindsay McArthur Buchanan daughter of John Buchanan of Glasgow in 1857. His brother John Holms was MP for Hackney.

References

External links

The Glasgow Story – sketch of W Holms

1827 births
UK MPs 1880–1885
UK MPs 1874–1880
Alumni of the University of Glasgow
Scottish Liberal Party MPs
Members of the Parliament of the United Kingdom for Paisley constituencies
1903 deaths